Colin Baron (20 May 1921 – 7 November 1987) was a British engineer from Yorkshire who designed weapon systems, namely anti-aircraft missiles (surface-to-air missiles), for the Ministry of Defence (UK).

Early life
He was the son of John Baron and Dorothy Crumpler. He was born in Nottingham. He attended a boys' grammar school (Carlton Bolling College since 1977) in the south-east of Bradford, then in the West Riding. From the University of Leeds he gained a BSc in Physics 1941 and an MSc in 1947.

Career

Royal Radar Establishment
At the RRE he did research on microwaves, which led to him becoming a division leader on guided weapons.

Royal Aircraft Establishment
At the RAE he became Head of the Guided Weapons Assessment Research Group in 1966. He later became Head of Avionics in 1970, then Flight Systems in 1974.

Rapier missile
From 1958 he had worked with Cambridge-educated John Twinn in developing an affordable guided missile that could knock out low-flying aircraft. The Army was more interested in artillery with proximity fuses. The cost of providing a missile with radar guidance was an expensive solution. The solution was to employ a Command to Line of Sight Guidance System (CLOS), whereby the missile contained no radar. The missile system had a system that optically tracked the aircraft and missile.

It was given to BAC who developed it further as the Rapier missile; it entered service in 1971.

Personal life
He married Margaret Whalley in 1942 in Bradford; they had a son (born 1944) and daughter (born 1943). He lived in Upton-upon-Severn. He married Anita Hale in 1961 in Worcester; he had a step-son. In his later life he lived in Farnham, Surrey.   He died at the age of 66.

See also
 :Category:Cold War surface-to-air missiles of the United Kingdom
 :Category:Missile guidance

References
 Times obituary Saturday 14 November 1987, page 12

 

1921 births
1987 deaths
Alumni of the University of Leeds
British Aircraft Corporation
Civil servants in the Ministry of Defence (United Kingdom)
Military research of the United Kingdom
Engineers from Bradford
People from Nottingham
English engineers